Reidar Karlsen (4 January 1911 – 21 June 1996) was a Norwegian footballer. He played in one match for the Norway national football team in 1932.

References

External links
 

1911 births
1996 deaths
Norwegian footballers
Norway international footballers
Place of birth missing
Association footballers not categorized by position